The English disease or British disease may refer to:

The British disease, a term for the economic stagnation the nation underwent during the 1970s
Football hooliganism carried out by British fans
Sudor anglicus, also known as the sweating sickness, common in sixteenth-century Europe
Rickets
The English Disease, a novel by Joseph Skibell
Perceived trade union militancy in the 1970s–1980s, in particular the Winter of Discontent and ending with the 1984–1985 miners' strike
 The English Disease (album)